Telman may refer to the following places:

Telman, former name for Çayoba, a municipality in southern Azerbaijan
in Kyrgyzstan:
Telman, Panfilov, a village in Panfilov District, Chuy Region
Telman, Ysyk-Ata, a village in Ysyk-Ata District, Chuy Region
Telman, Jalal-Abad, a village in the city of Jalal-Abad, Jalal-Abad Region
Telman, Osh, a village in Kara-Suu District, Osh Region